The 2004 Asian Indoor Athletics Championships was an international indoor athletics event took place in Tehran, Iran, between 6 and 8 February. The female events were held separately from the men's events, taking place during the morning sessions. Due to the Islamic country's customs, men were forbidden from watching the female events.

A total of 23 nations sent athletes to compete at the championships, which featured 30 track and field events. China topped the medal table with 11 golds. Iran was second with six golds while Kazakhstan finished third with four golds.

Results

Men

Women

Medal table

Participating nations
A total of 23 nations were represented by athletes competing at the 2004 championships.

References

External links
Medalists
Partial results

Indoor 2004
Asian Indoor Championships
Athletics
Asian Indoor Championships
Sport in Tehran
2004 in Asian sport